SOPHAEROS is a computer code, used by the AECL and French Nuclear program to simulate the transfer of fission products in the reactor chamber.  It models fission product behaviour using a set of aerosol dynamic rules, and is used by AECL in fuel channel safety analyses.

References
Adrian V. Gheorghe and Ralf Mock. Risk Engineering: Bridging Risk Analysis With Stakeholders Values. Springer, Jan 1, 1999. pg. 72

Atomic Energy of Canada Limited